Deronje is a village in Serbia. It is situated in the Odžaci municipality, in the West Bačka District, Vojvodina province. The village has a Serb ethnic majority and its population is 2,847 people (2002 census).

Historical population

1869: 2,241
1880: 2,234
1890: 2,340
1900: 2,506
1910: 2,668
1921: 2,752
1931: 2,902
1948: 3,147
1953: 3,337
1961: 3,312
1971: 3,154
1981: 2,963
1991: 2,889
2002: 2,847

See also
List of places in Serbia
List of cities, towns and villages in Vojvodina

References
Slobodan Ćurčić, Broj stanovnika Vojvodine, Novi Sad, 1996.

Gallery

Places in Bačka
West Bačka District
Odžaci